Spinefarm Records is a Finnish independent record label focusing mainly on heavy metal artists. It is a subsidiary of Universal Music Group.

History 
Spinefarm Records was originally founded in 1990 by Riku Pääkkönen as a mail-order distribution company for rock and heavy metal albums and singles, but later became a record label for Finnish acts such as Nightwish, Children of Bodom, and Sonata Arctica.

In 1999, a sub-label titled Spikefarm Records was started by Sami Tenetz from Thy Serpent. Since 2002, Spinefarm has been part of Universal Music Group, but operates as an independent business unit.

In autumn 2007, Spinefarm launched in the UK, starting with re-issuing deluxe versions of the first five Nightwish albums, including the Over the Hills and Far Away EP.

At the start of 2016, it was announced that Spinefarm Records had acquired Candlelight Records.

On 18 August 2017, Spinefarm Records announced the global launch of sub-label Snakefarm Records. Snakefarm has since signed Tyler Bryant & The Shakedown and more. The label's focus genres are roots rock, blues rock, and country.

Today, Spinefarm Records has offices in New York, London, and Helsinki.

Bands 
Spinefarm Music Group consists of three sub-labels: Spinefarm Records (mainstream heavy metal and hard rock), Candlelight Records (extreme metal, black metal, and death metal), and Snakefarm Records (country, blues, and southern rock).

Spinefarm 

36 Crazyfists
Airbourne
Amaranthe
Amberian Dawn
Amorphis
Anti-Flag
Atreyu
Beherit
Barathrum
Beto Vázquez Infinity
Billy Talent
The Black League
Bob Malmström
Brother Firetribe
The Browning
Bullet for My Valentine
 Celesty
Charon
Children of Bodom
ChthoniC
Creeper
Crow Mother
D'espairsRay (UK only)
Dark Tranquillity
Darkwoods My Betrothed
Dayseeker
Dayshell
Dead by April
Dead Poet Society
Diablo Swing Orchestra
DragonForce
Dragonlord
Dreamtale
Eilera
Electric Wizard
Emigrate
Employed to Serve
End of You
Entheos
Eternal Tears of Sorrow
Finntroll
Five Finger Death Punch (US only)
For My Pain
Hangman's Chair
He is Legend
Hevein
Helloween (UK only)
In Mourning
Jettblack
Kalmah
Killing Joke
Kiuas
Kobra and the Lotus
The Kovenant
Lullacry
Machinae Supremacy
Metsatöll
Mucc (UK only)
myGRAIN
My Passion
My Ticket Home
Nightwish
Nonpoint
Norther
One Morning Left
Pain Confessor
Puppy
Reckless Love
Rotten Sound
Saint Asonia
Santa Cruz
Satyricon
Saul
Seether
Sentenced
Sethian
Shining (Nor)
Shining (Swe)
Sinergy
Slaves to Gravity
Sleep Token
Soen
Sonata Arctica
Swallow the Sun
Tarja Turunen
Tarot
Throne of Chaos
Thy Serpent
To/Die/For
Toothgrinder
The Treatment
Turbowolf
Twilightning
Von Hertzen Brothers
Voodoo Six
Warmen
Venom
VRSTY
We Came as Romans (Europe only)

Candlelight 

Absu
 Coltsblood
 Black Moth
 Burning The Oppressor
 Daylight Dies
 Demon Lung
 Diablo Swing Orchestra
 Emperor
 Ihsahn
 Khors
 Limbonic Art
 Ninkharsag
 Orange Goblin
 PSOTY
 Shade Empire
 Shrapnel
 Sigh
 Sigiriya
 Throne Of Katarsis
 Ultra Violence
 Vampillia
 Vision of Disorder
 Voices
 Winterfylleth
 Witchsorrow
 Zyklon

Snakefarm 

 Austin Meade
Billy Gibbons (UK only)
 Broken Witt Rebels
 Brothers Osborne (UK only)
 Eric Church (UK only)
 George Thorogood (UK only)
 Gov't Mule (UK only)
 Hogjaw
 Kendell Marvel (Europe)
 Kip Moore (UK only)
 Tedeschi Trucks Band (UK only)
 The Marcus King Band (UK only)
 The Record Company (UK only)
 The Temperance Movement (US & Canada)
 Tyler Bryant & The Shakedown
 Whiskey Myers (Europe)

See also 
List of record labels
Deathwish Inc.

References

External links 

 
Finnish record labels
Black metal record labels
Death metal record labels
Heavy metal record labels
Labels distributed by Universal Music Group
Record labels established in 1990